Pariseau may refer to:

Mother Joseph Pariseau (1823–1902), Canadian Religious Sister
Pat Pariseau (1936-2020), American politician from Minnesota
Île Pariseau, an island in Canada
Léo-Pariseau Prize

See also
 Parizeau, a surname